In Carelse v Estate De Vries, an important case in South African succession law, Carelse was seduced, on the promise of marriage, by the deceased (who was already married with children). Carelse and the deceased continued their relationship, which produced seven children, before the deceased died intestate.

At that time, the Intestate Succession Act said that illegitimate children could not inherit from their deceased parents. The court held, however, that this was no longer the proper position, and awarded maintenance to the children. Although the deceased died intestate, the principle is the same for persons who die testate.

See also 
 South African succession law

References 
Carelse v Estate de Vries (1906) 23 SC 532  ; 16 CTR 787
The Law of South Africa. Butterworths. Durban. 2006. Volume 16. Paragraphs 194 and 215 to 218.
The Law of South Africa. Volume 31. Butterworths. 1988. Page 134.
Maasdorp's Institutes of South African Law. Eighth Edition. Juta & Company Limited. 1958. Volume 1. Page 8.
The Selective Voet. Butterworth. Volume 4. Page 114. Volume 7. Page 378.
R W Lee. An Introduction to Roman-Dutch Law. Second Edition. Clarendon Press. 1915. Pages 31 and 273.
H J Erasmus and M J De Waal. The South African Law of Succession. Butterworths. 1989. Paragraph 101 at page 65.
David Meyerowitz. The Law and Practice of Administration of Estates. Fourth Edition. Juta & Co. 1966. Pages 267 and 268.
P Q R Boberg. The Law of Persons and the Family. Juta & Company Ltd. Cape Town, Wynberg and Johannesburg. 1977. Pages 279, 283, 286 and 341.
D S P Cronjé. The South African Law of Persons and Family Law. Third Edition. Butterworths. 1994. Pages 70 and 147.
Sinclair and Heaton. The Law of Marriage. Fifth Edition. Juta. 1996. Volume 1. Page 329.
H R Hahlo and Ellison Kahn. The South African Law of Husband and Wife. Third Edition. Juta & Co Limited. Cape Town, Wynberg and Johannesburg. 1969. Pages 54 and 468.
Lesbury Van Zyl. Handbook of the South African Law of Maintenance. Second Edition. LexisNexis Butterworths. 2005. Pages 3, 16 and 17.
Marius J de Waal, "Family Provision in South Africa". Reid, de Waal and Zimmerman (eds). Mandatory Family Protection. (Comparative Succession Law, volume 3). Oxford University Press. 2020. Page 481.
C J Davel. Introduction to Child Law in South Africa. Juta. 2000. Pages 44, 46 and 48.
Parental and State Responsibility for Children: The Development of South African and Sri Lankan Law. Stamford Lake. 2005. Page 245.
R G McKerron. The Law of Delict. Seventh Edition. Juta & Co Limited. 1971. Pages 74 and 164.
Vernon V Palmer. The Roman-Dutch and Sesotho Law of Delict. Sijthoff. 1970. Page 152.
T W Bennett. The Application of Customary Law in Southern Africa. Juta & Co Ltd. 1985. Page 144.
J A M Khumalo. The Civil Practice of All Courts for Blacks in Southern Africa. Third Edition. Juta & Co Ltd. 1984. Page 206.
(1907) 3 Natal Law Journal 38 (February 1907)
The Rhodesian Law Journal 1973. Page 38.
"Paternity and Maintenance" (1999) 12(1) Lesotho Law Journal 39 at 42
Dougie Oakes (ed). You and Your Rights. Reader's Digest Association. 1992. Page 88.

Notes 

South African case law
1906 in South African law
1906 in case law